Jafrul Islam Chowdhury (14 October 1950 – 8 November 2022) was a Bangladeshi politician of Bangladesh Nationalist Party and a four-term Jatiya Sangsad member representing the Chittagong-15 constituency. He served as the state minister for forest and environment ministry in the Second Khaleda Cabinet during 2001–2006.

Early life
Chowdhury was born on 14 October 1950. He completed his undergraduate in commerce.

Career
Chowdhury served as a state minister for environment and forest in the Second Khaleda Cabinet. He was nominated from Bangladesh Nationalist Party in Chittagong-15 for the 2008 Bangladeshi general election. In June 2009, he made the Joint Convenor of Bangladesh Nationalist Party unit of Chittagong South. In 2010, he served as the Chittagong south district President of Bangladesh Nationalist Party. He was the only member of parliament from Bangladesh Nationalist Party in the Bangladesh-Japan Parliamentary Friendship Group. His cousin, Aminur Rahman Chowdhury, was charged with being involved in the murder of 11 members of a Hindu family in the Banshkhali carnage case.

Personal life and death
Chowdhury died in Chittagong on 8 November 2022, at the age of 72.

References

1950 births
2022 deaths
People from Banshkhali Upazila
Bangladesh Nationalist Party politicians
6th Jatiya Sangsad members
7th Jatiya Sangsad members
8th Jatiya Sangsad members
9th Jatiya Sangsad members
State Ministers of Environment and Forests (Bangladesh)